F series may refer to:
Ford F series – trucks
Fujifilm FinePix F series – cameras
Mack F series – trucks
Sony Vaio F series – laptop computers
Sony Walkman F series – portable media players
Sony Ericsson F series – a series of cell phones
QI (F series) – the sixth series of the TV quiz show QI
Waco F series – biplanes

See also
 E series (disambiguation)
 G series (disambiguation)